Belleville Municipal Airport  is a city-owned airport a mile west of Belleville, in Republic County, Kansas, United States.

Most U.S. airports use the same three-letter location identifier for the FAA and IATA, but Belleville is RPB to the FAA and has no IATA code.

Facilities

In the year ending July 24, 2007 the airport had 7,650 aircraft operations, average 20 per day: 99% general aviation and 1% military. Eleven aircraft were then based at the airport: nine single-engine and two ultralight.

References

External links

Airports in Kansas
Buildings and structures in Republic County, Kansas